Mary Patten (born 1951, Evanston, IL) is a Chicago artist and activist. Her works combine writing, video installation, performance, artists' books, drawing, photography, collaboration, and activism. Her writing, lectures, videos, and artwork deal with the relationship between art and politics, visual culture, queer theory, terrorism, prisons and torture. She has an MFA from University of Illinois at Chicago (1992) and a BFA from the Kansas City Art Institute. Her videos are distributed by the Video Data Bank and she teaches at the School of the Art Institute of Chicago as an Associate Professor in the department of Film, Video, New Media, and Animation. She also teaches in the Visual and Critical Studies department and is currently the Chair of the department of Film, Video, New Media, and Animation (2016).

Recent exhibitions
 Organize Your Own: The Politics and Poetics of Self-Determination Movements, Averill and Bernard Leviton Gallery, 2016 
 Mary Patten: Panel, Threewalls Gallery, Chicago, IL, 2013 
 Whitewalls: Writings by Artists 1978–2008, Golden Gallery, Chicago, IL, 2012
 Opening the Blackbox: The Charge is Torture, Sullivan Galleries, Chicago, IL, 2012
 The Archival Impulse, Gallery 400, Chicago, IL, 2011

Awards
 Maker Grant, 2013
 Illinois Arts Council Individual Project Grant, 2013
 Propeller Fund, 2013
 SAIC Faculty Enrichment Grant, 2010–11
Artadia Award, 2002

Activism
Mary Patten was a member of DAGMAR (Dykes and Gay Men Against Racism and Repression) that began in 1984 and evolved to become CFAR (Chicago for AIDS Rights), an activist group addressing HIV/AIDS. Patten was one of the founders of ACT UP/Chicago. She is an organizer of the Chicago Torture Justice Memorials (CTJM), aiming to seek justice for survivors of Chicago Police torture and their families. In addition to her work in the LGBTQ communities, Patten has created and curated art for the feminist movement, such as the 2014 exhibit "Bad Girls: Video Program: She Laughed When She Saw It" at the New Museum in New York City. Other projects of Patten include the Madame Binh Graphics Collective, Feel Tank Chicago, WhiteWalls, RIOT GRRRANDMAS!!!, and Bad Girls. She is also a member of the art/activist group Feel Tank Chicago.

References

External links and further reading 
 Mary Patten's Personal Web Page
 Mary Patten's writing
 Chicago Torture Justice Memorials
 Video Data Bank Profile
 Mary Patten's Faculty profile, School of the Art Institute of Chicago
 Feel Tank Chicago
 Mary Patten on Bad at Sports
 Review from Art in America Magazine by Danny Orendorff
 ACT UP Home Page

1951 births
American video artists
American women writers
Living people
Members of ACT UP
School of the Art Institute of Chicago faculty
American LGBT rights activists
American women academics